Chang Kai-chen and Han Xinyun were the defending champions, but both players chose not to participate.

Naiktha Bains and Francesca Di Lorenzo won the title, defeating Manon Arcangioli and Shérazad Reix in the final, 6–4, 1–6, [11–9].

Seeds

Draw

Draw

References
Main Draw

Engie Open Saint-Gaudens Occitanie - Doubles